Güémez Municipality is a municipality located in the Mexican state of Tamaulipas. It is known in Mexico for being the hometown of the "Güémez Philosopher", a somewhat fictional wise man who uses simple ideas to explain complex situations.

External links
 Gobierno Municipal de Güémez official website

Municipalities of Tamaulipas